The Foreman Went to France (released in the USA as Somewhere in France ) is a 1942 British Second World War war film starring Clifford Evans, Tommy Trinder, Constance Cummings and Gordon Jackson. It was based on the real-life wartime exploits of Welsh munitions worker Melbourne Johns, who rescued machinery used to make guns for Spitfires and Hurricanes. It was an Ealing Studios film made in 1941 with the support of the War Office and the Free French Forces. All of the 'heroes' are portrayed as ordinary people caught up in the war.

Plot
In 1940, Welsh armaments factory foreman Fred Carrick goes to France on his own initiative to retrieve three large pieces of machinery for making cannon for Spitfires before the German army arrives. In Bivary, he requests the aid of two soldiers and, more importantly, use of their army lorry. He also gets the help of the company secretary in France, an American woman who needs to go north to find her sister who is a nurse.

While in France, Carrick learns about the rôle of the fifth column, and that even those in positions of authority such as the town mayor cannot always be trusted. During the race to the coast with the machines, he encounters a huge number of refugees fleeing the advancing Nazis and many more obstacles to hinder his progress. They take half-a-dozen orphaned children on their journey, entertaining the children with humorous songs.

Cast
 Clifford Evans as Fred Carrick, the foreman
 Tommy Trinder as Tommy Hoskins
 Constance Cummings as Anne Stafford the American
 Robert Morley as Mayor Coutare of Bivary
 Gordon Jackson as Alastair 'Jock' MacFarlane
 Ernest Milton as the stationmaster in La Tour
 Charles Victor as the aircraft spotter on the Works roof
 John Williams as the 'English' army captain
 Paul Bonifas as the Prefect of Rouville
 Anita Palacine as a La Tour barmaid
 Francis L. Sullivan as a French skipper
 Mervyn Johns as Official, Passport Office
 Sidney Adams as Driver
 Owen Reynolds as Collins, Burns & Fawcett Works Manager
 Ronald Adam as Sir Charles Fawcett, Managing Director in Wales
 Eric Maturin as Older Man (uncredited)

Production
Filmed during the war, location shooting for the scenes set in France was done in Cornwall, Kent, and Berkshire. Filming took 12 months as it was continually interrupted by blitzes.

Reception
Dr. Keith M. Johnston, lecturer in Film & Television Studies at the University of East Anglia, described it as "a strange little propaganda piece, a flashback-structured film that dramatises the 'true' story of Melbourne Johns ... Overall, this is a nicely done little film, but it survives largely because of a committed cast and some strong narrative elements."

References

External links
 
 
 
 
 

1942 films
1942 war films
1940s biographical films
British war films
British biographical films
British black-and-white films
World War II films made in wartime
World War II films based on actual events
Films set in 1940
Films set in France
Ealing Studios films
Films directed by Charles Frend
Films produced by Michael Balcon
Films scored by William Walton
1940s English-language films
1940s British films